Point of View is an art installation, created by the California artist Matthew Passmore,  consisting of two towers installed in Haifa, Israel, and San Francisco, California. The towers serve as periscopes, offering live views of the other city to viewers.

References

Art in San Francisco
Buildings and structures in Haifa
Buildings and structures in San Francisco
North Beach, San Francisco
Public art in Israel